Zoltán Bükszegi (born 16 December 1975) is a Hungarian football player who last played for Víkingur Gøta.

External links

1975 births
Living people
Footballers from Budapest
Hungarian footballers
Hungary international footballers
Hungary under-21 international footballers
Olympic footballers of Hungary
Footballers at the 1996 Summer Olympics
Association football forwards
Budapesti VSC footballers
Ferencvárosi TC footballers
MTK Budapest FC players
Vasas SC players
Dunaújváros FC players
Újpest FC players
Hungarian expatriate footballers
Expatriate footballers in Cyprus
Nea Salamis Famagusta FC players
Hungarian expatriate sportspeople in Cyprus
Cypriot First Division players
Cypriot Second Division players
Alki Larnaca FC players
Expatriate footballers in the Faroe Islands
Víkingur Gøta players
Hungarian expatriate sportspeople in the Faroe Islands